Cass County Electric Cooperative is a public utility cooperative based in Fargo, North Dakota.  It serves as the electric distribution utility in a portion of southeast North Dakota, with service stretching from Fargo to Eckelson.  It receives power from the Minnkota Power Cooperative.

External links
Cass County Electric Cooperative site

References

Electric cooperatives in North Dakota
Electric power companies of the United States